The Global Scavenger Hunt is an annual international travel adventure competition in which teams of two people travel around the world in competition with other teams to win The World’s Greatest Travelers title and trophy.

History 
The first event was scheduled for 2001 but postponed due to the events of 9/11. The inaugural event took place in the spring of 2002. A spring 2003 event was cancelled due to the SARS epidemic and the onset of the Iraq War. The event has been held annually since 2008. The Global Scavenger Hunt originally called GreatEscape, was created in 1999 and launched in 2000. Inspired by his 1989 participation in an around-the-world race called the HumanRace, Chalmers, and his travel companion, Andy J. Valvur, won the one-off event collecting the $20,000 first place prize money in 17-days. Chalmers later wrote a book chronicling their exploits entitled A Blind Date with the World in 2000 and was later dubbed the "world's greatest traveler" in National Geographic Traveler magazine.

The event 
The Global Scavenger Hunt is a series of rallies around the world. Competitors participating in attempt to complete a series of culturally-oriented scavenges from a scavenger hunt book created for each leg of the rally-like event. Scavenges are assigned points based on completion difficulty.

During each event, competitors travel to and within at least ten countries, across four continents during each event, but never know in advance which countries they are going to be visiting. The event is designed to test the participants collective 'travel IQ' requiring them to overcome language and communications barriers, cultural nuances, logistics, jet lag, team dynamics and 23-days of traveling across 24 time zones through ten countries.

Teams are also prohibited from using any technology to assist them and are limited to using only local modes of public transportation as they attempt to complete the scavenges in the goal of fostering the "trusting of strangers in strange lands."

The scavenges, based on a risk-reward points system, include food scavenges, participatory site-doing scavenges, karma-building scavenges, assigned urban, rural and nature-oriented photo safaris, playing Bartender Roulette, polling locals on issues of the day, performing blind taste tests, figuring out how to crash major cultural happenings.

Each leg is tallied and the eventual winners of the event are crowned The World's Greatest Travelers and given that title for that year. The event is considered to be the annual "world travel championship" and called the "Super Bowl of travel adventure competitions". Winning teams earn the right to defend their The World's Greatest Travelers title in the next event with all entry fees waived. The event is open to all international travel adventure competitors, and has no set course as it is changed each year. As of 2019, the annual around the world travel adventure event has visited over 85 countries across 6 continents.

Events to date 
 2002 (April 12 – May 4) – Los Angeles to Japan to Hong Kong to Thailand to UAE to Egypt to Turkey to Italy to Switzerland to Germany to New York City, USA
 2003 – Scheduled for April 2003 and was cancelled due to the global SARS epidemic and outbreak of the Iraq War.
 2004 (April 16 – May 8) – Los Angeles to China to Viet Nam to Cambodia to Thailand to India to UAE to Morocco to Gibraltar to Spain to Portugal to New York City, USA
 2005 (April 15 – May 7) – Los Angeles to China to India to UAE to Egypt to Turkey to Czech Republic to Austria to Poland to Hungary to New York City, USA
 2008 (April 11 – May 3) – San Francisco to China to Malaysia to Singapore to Nepal to Bahrain to Egypt to Greece to Macedonia to Bulgaria to Romania to The Netherlands to Toronto, Canada
 2009 (April 17 – May 9) – Seattle to Taiwan to Cambodia to Thailand to India to Turkey to Tunisia to Germany to Denmark to Sweden to Iceland to Boston, USA
 2010 (April 9 – May 1) – San Francisco to Hong Kong to Viet Nam to Laos to Myanmar to Thailand to Sri Lanka to Jordan to Austria to Slovakia to Germany to Luxembourg to France to New York City, USA
 2011 (April 15 – May 7) – Los Angeles to Korea to Philippines to Indonesia to Singapore to India to Turkey to Spain to Gibraltar to Morocco to Portugal to New York City, USA
 2012 (April 13 – May 5) – San Francisco to Taiwan to Myanmar to Thailand to Sri Lanka to Oman to Cyprus to Italy to San Marino to Slovenia to Austria to Czech Republic to Washington D.C., USA
 2013 (April 12 – May 4) – Los Angeles to China to Viet Nam to Cambodia to Malaysia to Nepal to Qatar to Germany to Denmark to Sweden to Norway to Toronto, Canada
 2014 (April 12 – May 4) – Vancouver to Japan to South Korea to India to UAE to Turkey to Hungary to Austria to Slovakia to Czech Republic to Poland to Chicago, USA
 2015 (April 10 – May 2) – Los Angeles to Fiji to Australia to Indonesia to Malaysia to UAE to Italy to Switzerland to France to Andorra to Spain to Colombia to Miami, USA
 2016 (April 15 – May 7) – Mexico City to Japan to India to Oman to Kenya to Poland to Lithuania to Estonia to Russia to Finland to Washington D.C., USA
 2017 (April 14 – May 6) – San Francisco to China to Viet Nam to Thailand to Sri Lanka to Egypt to Brussels to England to Wales to Ireland to Iceland to New York City, USA
 2018 (April 13 – May 5) – San Francisco to Taiwan to India to Ethiopia to Zimbabwe/Zambia/Botswana/Namibia to South Africa to Argentina/Uruguay to Peru to USA
 2019 (April 12 – May 4) – Vancouver, Canada to Viet Nam to Myanmar to Thailand to UAE to Jordan to Greece to Morocco to Spain to Gibraltar to Portugal to New York City, USA

Teams

Charity 
The world travel championship adventure competition also serves as a charitable fundraising event for humanitarian organizations with the twin funding goals of building 14 schools (mostly co-ed elementary) with organizations like Free The Children in developing nations such as: Kenya, Niger, Sri Lanka, Sierra Leone, India, Haiti, Ethiopia and Ecuador; as well as, providing funds for micro-loans in conjunction with KIVA.org that have assisted over 3,300 families in over 75 countries. It has also funded a medical clinic and midwife educational center in Niger inconjuction with the Nomad Foundation.

See also 
 The Amazing Race
 Eco-Challenge
 Raid Gauloises
 Geocaching
 Teva Lea Race
 City Chase
 Great Urban Race

References 

Citation overkill
Adventure travel
Adventure racing
Recurring events established in 2002